Legislative elections were held in Indonesia on 4 May 1982. They were the fourth legislative elections since independence and the third under the New Order regime There were three participants; the two political parties, the United Development Party (PPP), the Indonesian Democratic Party (PDI) and the "functional group" Golkar. As with all elections during the New Order regime, the government-backed Golkar organization won an absolute majority.

Background
Following the 1978 reelection of President Suharto by the People's Consultative Assembly a year after the victory of the government political vehicle Golkar in the legislative election, the government started to make preparations for the next five-yearly vote by submitting a revised election law to the legislature. Among the changes discussed were the symbols used by the parties. The government's proposed law included a provision banning party symbols that "might generate conflict affecting the unity and integrity of the nation". At the time, the Islamic United Development Party symbol was the Kaaba, while the Indonesian Democratic Party used a symbol similar to the National emblem of Indonesia. Both parties wanted to retain their symbols. Both parties also wanted a reduction in the number of seats awarded by government nominees to be reduced from 100 to 75. Ultimately the bill was passed, with no changes to party logos or the number of appointed legislative members. However, an additional 4 seats, on top of the 360 elected seats, were allocated to the new province of East Timor following its annexation, and these were take from the non-military appointed seats.

Campaign
The official election campaign lasted from 15 March to 27 April, followed by a "quiet week" before polling day on 4 May. As in 1977, the government used a variety of tactics to ensure a victory for Golkar. As well as shortening the campaign period by 15 days, the government regulation on the election required all contestants to submit campaign plans a week in advance, allowed regional governments to ban campaign activities seen as potentially disrupting public order and gave the government the power to reject electoral candidates, which it did to the detriment of the two parties. The government also pressured civil servants not only to vote Golkar, but also to persuade family members and friends to do so, while the army provided support for Golkar in the form of its campaign to enter villages to ensure people in rural areas gave their support.

There were a number of violent incidents during the campaign, and two news publications, including the weekly news magazine Tempo were banned for reporting on them. In the most serious incident, on March 18, clashes between PPP and Golkar supporters at a Golkar rally on Jakarta's Lapangan Banteng led to rioting and arson. The Golkar stage was set alight and 318 people were arrested. There was also campaign violence in Yogyakarta and Solo.

Results
Once again Golkar won an absolute majority, with over 64% of the vote, beating its performance in both previous elections, while both political parties saw their vote fall. Golkar won a majority of votes in all provinces except Aceh, and including the four seats in won in East Timur, its directly elected seat total increased by 14 when the results were announced on June 14. The two parties each lost five seats.

Aftermath
On 1 October the elected members took their oaths and the new People's Representative Council was inaugurated. The following year, the People's Consultative Assembly, comprising the elected legislature and government-appointed members, elected Suharto for a fourth presidential term.

References

Bibliography

 
 
 

Election and referendum articles with incomplete results
Legislative elections in Indonesia
May 1982 events in Asia
New Order (Indonesia)
Indonesia
1982 in Indonesia
People's Consultative Assembly